The St. George's Cricket Club Tournament was a late 19th century men's international grass court tennis tournament first held on courts at the St. George's Cricket Club, Hoboken, New Jersey, United States, from 1881 to 1883.

History
The St. George's Cricket Club Tournament was an late 19th century tennis event first staged in 1881 at the St. George's Cricket Club, Hoboken, New Jersey, USA. The first winner of the mens singles was Ireland's John J. Cairnes. The final known mens edition in 1886 was won by American player Robert Livingston Beeckman. It was a regular annual event for three years on the men's U.S.N.L.T.A lawn tennis seasons.

Finals

Mens Singles

References

Defunct tennis tournaments in the United States
Grass court tennis tournaments
Hoboken, New Jersey
Tennis tournaments in New Jersey